Owing to the territory's subtropical climate, there are no natural winter sports venues in Hong Kong. Several artificial ice rinks have been constructed since the late 20th century, mainly inside shopping centres.

List of ice rinks in Hong Kong

History

1972 - The First Ice Rink 
In a subtropical city like Hong Kong, there is no ice and snow in winter. Ice skating was not available to the locals until the 1st artificial ice rink was built in Lai Chi Kwok Amusement Park or commonly called "Lai Yuen".

Note: A newspaper mentioned that there was an ice rink in a private club as early as 1940. As there is no other supporting that it was an artificial rink, it was included in this record.

1982 - The First Shopping Mall Ice Rink 

Swire Properties opened the first-ever shopping mall ice rink in Cityplaza or commonly known as "Taikoo Shing". Although it was small rink, the ice rink got so popular that the rink was moved from Cityplaza Phase 1 to Cityplaza Phase 2, a much larger ice surface.

1990 to 1991 - Grow from 2 rinks to 5 rinks 

Shopping Malls owner, seeing the successful story of Cityplaza Ice Palace, followed suits. 3 new ice rinks opens in 6 months time:

 Hutchison Group opened Whampoa Super Ice in Whampoa Garden
 New World Development opened Riviera Ice Chalet in Riviera Garden
 Sun Hung Kai Properties opened Tsuen Wan Plaza Ice Rink in Tsuen Wan Plaza

1990 to 1994 Mr. John Wagner - Ice Rink Resources Limited - 3 new rinks 
Mr. John Wagner was the shopping mall manager of Cityplaza. He brought the idea of shopping mall ice rink to Hong Kong. After he retired from Swire Properties, he founded Ice Rink Resources Limited - an ice rink building and management company.

His company not only build and manage Riviera Ice Chalet, but further involved in building/managing 3 more ice rinks in Hong Kong and the 1st ice rink in Macau:

 Sino Group opened Crystal Palace in Tuen Mun Town Plaza (1992). The rink was converted from car park spaces and had a low ceiling and 2 columns on the ice.
 Future Bright Group opened Future Bright Ice Rink in Future Bright Amusement Park (1992)
 Aberdeen Club opened Aberdeen Marina Club Ice Rink in Aberdeen Marina Club (1993)
 ETON Properties opened Sky Rink in Dragon Centre (1994). The rink was built on a site that was originally designed for a cinema, public area was very limited.
Ice Rink Resources Limited's successor Ice Rink Management Asia Limited was formed in 1994 and kept on opening ice rinks around Asia.

1994 to 1997 3 ice rinks closed down

1994 Closure of Crystal Palace 
1994 Crystal Palace closed down 1 year after Ice Rink Resources Limited, due to payment issues, withdraw from management. The site was changed to a shooting range.

??? Closure of Tsuen Wan Plaza Ice Rink 
Unexpectedly, Tsuen Wan Plaza closed down and the site was rented to Jumpin Gym U.S.A.

1996-1997 Opening and closure of Yuen Long Plaza Ice Rink 
It was said that Sun Hung Kai Properties moved some of the equipment of Tsuen Wan Plaza and opened another rink in Yuen Long Plaza. However, the rink was closed in about 1 year time.

1997 Closure of Whampoa Super Ice 
Though the business is good in Whampoa Super Ice, the landlord did not extend the lease with the rink in 1997. The site was again rented to Jumpin Gym U.S.A.

1997 Asian Financial Crisis 
The 1997 Asian financial crisis put a halt to the growth of ice rinks in Hong Kong. For nearly 10 years, no new ice rink was built. No new ice rink was built around Asia for at least 5 years.

1998 Festival Walk Glacier became the largest ice rink in Hong Kong 

Ted Wilson, manager of Cityplaza Ice Palace, first proposed to Swire Properties for a second ice rink in 1992. After more than 6 years of planning, Swire Properties finally opened its second ice rink, Festival Walk Glacier, in Kowloon Tong. Festival Walk Glacier became the largest ice rink in Hong Kong.

The project was delayed due to unexpected construction complications.

2007-2008 Ice Hockey and the First Standard Size Ice Rink 

Two new ice rinks, both promoting ice hockey, opened. One of them is the first standard-size ice rink in Hong Kong:

 Chickeeduck's owner Hubert Chow, formed The Rink and opened The Rink Elements
 Kerry Properties opened Mega Ice in MegaBox - the first standard size ice rink in Hong Kong

2021 Openings of 2 More Standard Size Ice Rinks 

 Hong Kong Resort Company Limited opened DB Ice Rink in Discovery Bay
LOHAS Rink in The LOHAS

References

Ice rinks by country
Ice rinks
Ice rinks